Mohamed Sankoh (born 16 October 2003) is a Dutch professional footballer who plays as a striker for Eredivisie club Vitesse, on loan from VfB Stuttgart.

Career
In the summer of 2020, Sankoh moved to VfB Stuttgart. He made his debut for the first team of Stuttgart in the Bundesliga on 25 April 2021 against RB Leipzig.

On 18 November 2021, Sankoh extended his contract with VfB Stuttgart until June 2026.

On 22 July 2022, he moved to Vitesse on loan.

International career
Born in the Netherlands, Sankoh is of Sierra Leonean descent. He is a youth international for the Netherlands, and helped the Netherlands U17s win the 2019 UEFA European Under-17 Championship.

Honours
Netherlands U17
UEFA European Under-17 Championship: 2019

References

External links

2003 births
Living people
People from Rijswijk
Dutch footballers
Netherlands youth international footballers
Dutch people of Sierra Leonean descent
Association football forwards
VfB Stuttgart II players
VfB Stuttgart players
SBV Vitesse players
Regionalliga players
Bundesliga players
Dutch expatriate footballers
Dutch expatriate sportspeople in Germany
Expatriate footballers in Germany